The William and Sue Damour House is a historic house located at 1844 Second Avenue SE in Cedar Rapids, Iowa.

Description and history 
Completed in 1917, this 2½-story, brick Georgian Revival structure was built by local contractor John Henry Cail. The house features a side gable roof with flanking chimneys and three gable dormers, a symmetrical facade, and a two-story solarium. A detached two-car car garage, built in 1926, sits behind the house. Located in the Wellington Heights neighborhood of Cedar Rapids, it is similar in size and construction to the other houses in this residential area.

The house was listed on the National Register of Historic Places on January 16, 1997, with the garage, deemed to be a second contributing building in the listing.  In 2000 it was included as a contributing property in the Second and Third Avenue Historic District.

References

Houses completed in 1917
Georgian Revival architecture in Iowa
Houses in Cedar Rapids, Iowa
National Register of Historic Places in Cedar Rapids, Iowa
Houses on the National Register of Historic Places in Iowa
Individually listed contributing properties to historic districts on the National Register in Iowa